The West Midlands Labour Party mayoral selection of 2016 was the process by which the Labour Party selected its candidate for Mayor of the West Midlands, to stand in the mayoral election on 4 May 2017.

The selection took place amid the backdrop of the 2016 Labour Leadership election, with Simon being a close friend and ally of Tom Watson, the Deputy Leader of the Labour Party, who had been calling for incumbent Labour Leader Jeremy Corbyn to step down. Steve Bedser pitched to Corbyn supporters, expressing his support for Corbyn, whilst simultaneously stating that Corbyn needed to improve his performance. On 10 August 2016, Simon was announced as the winning candidate.

Candidates

Not selected

Najma Hafeez, management consultant, former Birmingham City Councillor and former Chairwoman of City Hospital
 Milkinder Jaspal, Wolverhampton City Councillor
 Mary Simons-Jones, freelance book-seller

Declined

 Ian Austin, MP for Dudley North since 2005, and former Parliamentary Private Secretary to the Prime Minister under Gordon Brown.
 Liam Byrne, MP for Birmingham Hodge Hill, and former Chief Secretary to the Treasury under Gordon Brown.
 Darren Cooper, former leader of Sandwell Metropolitan Borough Council, was perceived as a potential candidate before his sudden death in March 2016.
 Gisela Stuart, MP for Birmingham Edgbaston, Chair of Vote Leave and former Parliamentary Under-Secretary of State for Health.

Membership ballot
The results of the selection were announced on 10 August 2016. A total of 3,817 valid votes were cast.

See also
 Greater Manchester Labour Party mayoral selection, 2016
 Liverpool City Region Labour Party mayoral selection, 2016
 London Labour Party mayoral selection, 2015

References

Labour Party (UK)
Labour Party (UK) primaries
2017 English local elections
Elections in the West Midlands (county)
2010s in the West Midlands (county)